Picloxydine (trade name Vitabact) is a bisbiguanide antiseptic used in eye drops. It is structurally similar to chlorhexidine.

References

Antiseptics
Guanidines
Piperazines
Chloroarenes